The 2010 Indiana earthquake registered 3.8 on the moment magnitude scale and struck near Greentown and Kokomo on December 30, 2010, at 12:55:21 UTC at a depth of 3 mi. The quake occurred approximately 50 miles north of Indiana's capital, Indianapolis. It joins only three other earthquakes that have affected the northern Indiana area since 1999. The “extremely rare and unprecedented” earthquake had the largest magnitude of a northern Indiana earthquake in 175 years. Despite being considered a rare occurrence, the affected region of northern Indiana lies near many fault lines including the Wabash Valley Seismic Zone and the New Madrid Seismic Zone. Both zones are hotspots for tectonic activity, with the Wabash Valley Fault Zone reaching earthquake depths up to 18 km (11.4 mi.) deep. It was incorrectly recorded by nearby stations as a 4.2 magnitude before being downgraded to 3.8. No significant damage was reported from the incident, but the quake was felt by thousands, spanning across multiple cities and states. Towns as far away as Kalamazoo, Michigan and states as far as Wisconsin and Kentucky reported the earthquake.

See also
List of earthquakes in 2010
List of earthquakes in the United States

References

2010 earthquakes
Earthquakes in Indiana
2010 in Indiana
2010 natural disasters in the United States
2010 in the United States